Hunter is a town in southeast Woodruff County, Arkansas, United States. The population was 152 at the 2000 census.

Gilbert G. Collier, awarded the Medal of Honor for his action in the Korean War, was born in Hunter.

Geography
Hunter is located at  (35.054256, -91.126122).

According to the United States Census Bureau, the town has a total area of 1.6 km2 (0.6 mi2), all land.

Demographics

As of the census of 2000, there were 152 people, 58 households, and 46 families residing in the town. The population density was 93.2/km2 (242.9/mi2). There were 77 housing units at an average density of 47.2/km2 (123.1/mi2). The racial makeup of the town was 97.37% White, 1.32% Black or African American, 0.66% Native American, and 0.66% from two or more races.

There were 58 households, out of which 31.0% had children under the age of 18 living with them, 69.0% were married couples living together, 8.6% had a female householder with no husband present, and 19.0% were non-families. 17.2% of all households were made up of individuals, and 5.2% had someone living alone who was 65 years of age or older. The average household size was 2.62 and the average family size was 2.98.

In the town, the population was spread out, with 25.0% under the age of 18, 7.2% from 18 to 24, 24.3% from 25 to 44, 24.3% from 45 to 64, and 19.1% who were 65 years of age or older. The median age was 42 years. For every 100 females, there were 111.1 males. For every 100 females age 18 and over, there were 100.0 males.

The median income for a household in the town was $22,500, and the median income for a family was $32,500. Males had a median income of $25,750 versus $13,438 for females. The per capita income for the town was $28,172. About 10.4% of families and 16.2% of the population were below the poverty line, including 20.0% of those under the age of eighteen and 15.2% of those 65 or over.

Education 
Public education for early childhood, elementary and secondary school students is provided by the Augusta School District, which leads to graduation from Augusta High School.

References

Towns in Arkansas
Towns in Woodruff County, Arkansas